Lochee railway station served the area of Lochee, Dundee, Scotland from 1861 to 1955 on the Dundee and Newtyle Railway.

History 
Designed by Edinburgh architect Sir James Gowans for the Dundee and Newtyle Railway, it was opened on 10 June 1861. A loop ran to Lochee Goods and Camperdown Line Works. The station closed to both passengers and goods traffic on 10 January 1955.

The station building was converted to in 1972 to the Lochee Burns Club, a social club and is now a category B listed building.

References

External links 

Disused railway stations in Dundee
Former Caledonian Railway stations
Railway stations in Great Britain opened in 1861
Railway stations in Great Britain closed in 1955
1861 establishments in Scotland
1955 disestablishments in Scotland
Listed railway stations in Scotland
Category B listed buildings in Dundee